Konstantin Kerschbaumer (born 1 July 1992) is an Austrian professional footballer who plays for Austrian club Wolfsberger AC as a central midfielder. He came to prominence in his homeland with SKN St. Pölten and won international caps for Austria between U16 and U19 level.

Club career

Rapid Wien 
A central midfielder, Kerschbaumer began his career in Austria with local clubs FC Tulln and AKA St. Pölten, progressing to help the latter club to the 2008–09 Jugendliga U19 title. He signed for Bundesliga club SK Rapid Wien in 2009, making 20 appearances and scoring five goals for the U19 team and progressing to the reserves, scoring two goals in four late-season Regionalliga Ost appearances. He was a reserve team regular during the 2010–11 season, making 29 appearances and scoring four goals. Kerschbaumer joined Erste Liga club First Vienna on loan for the duration of the 2011–12 season, making 33 appearances and scoring five goals. After also spending the 2012–13 season away on loan, Kerschbaumer departed the Weststadion during the 2013 off-season.

SKN St. Pölten (loan and permanent transfer) 
On 10 July 2012, Kerschbaumer joined Erste Liga club SKN St. Pölten on a season-long loan. He made 34 appearances and scored six goals during the 2012–13 season and joined the club on a permanent contract after the campaign. He improved his tally to seven goals in a successful 2013–14 season for the club, in which they finished fourth in the league to qualify for the Europa League. Kerschbaumer played in every match of St. Pölten's run to the Austrian Cup final, which ended in a 4–2 defeat to Red Bull Salzburg.

Kerschbaumer made 27 appearances and scored three goals during the first half of the 2014–15 season, before departing the club in January 2015. Kerschbaumer made 100 appearances and scored 16 goals during his two and a half years at the NV Arena.

Admira Wacker Mödling 
Kerschbaumer signed for Bundesliga strugglers Admira Wacker Mödling on 20 January 2015 on a -year contract. He made 16 appearances and scored one goal during the second half of the 2014–15 season, helping the club to finish above the relegation place. He departed the club in late June.

Brentford 
On 1 July 2015, Kerschbaumer moved to England to sign for Championship club Brentford on a four-year contract for an undisclosed fee and became the first Austrian to sign for the Griffin Park club. He began his Bees career as a starter under Marinus Dijkhuizen, before being dropped to the bench by Dijkhuizen's replacement Lee Carsley in early October. Despite utilising him as a substitute regularly, Carsley admitted in early November that Kerschbaumer "needs a lot of coaching. He runs as fast as he can everywhere without being effective". He alternated between starting roles and the bench through to the end of the 2015–16 season, making 31 appearances. Kerschbaumer's 6 assists was the second-highest at the club after Alan Judge.

Kerschbaumer made two early 2016–17 season appearances before falling out of favour with head coach Dean Smith and dropping out of the squad in mid-September 2016. On 5 February 2017, while making just his seventh appearance of the season, Kerschbaumer finally scored his first goal for the club in a 3–3 draw with Brighton & Hove Albion. Injury to Josh McEachran led head coach Smith to include Kerschbaumer in the starting lineup for the first time since the opening day of the season for a match versus Rotherham United on 25 February. He started the majority of the remaining matches of the season and finished the campaign with 21 appearances and one goal.

In late June 2017, Kerschbaumer agreed a one-year extension option to his contract and joined 2. Bundesliga club Arminia Bielefeld on a season-long loan. He made 32 appearances and scored eight goals during the 2017–18 season, in which the Blues narrowly missed out on the promotion playoff place. Kerschbaumer departed Brentford on 1 June 2018 and made 52 appearances and scored one goal during two seasons as a first team player at Griffin Park.

FC Ingolstadt 04 
On 1 June 2018, Kerschbaumer joined 2. Bundesliga club FC Ingolstadt 04 on a three-year contract for an undisclosed fee (reported to be £900,000), effective 1 July 2018. He made 29 appearances and scored four goals during a disastrous 2018–19 season, which culminated in relegation to the 3. Liga. Kerschbaumer departed the club in September 2019.

1. FC Heidenheim
On 2 September 2019, Kerschbaumer moved back up to the 2. Bundesliga to sign a three-year contract with 1. FC Heidenheim, for an undisclosed fee. He made 26 appearances and scored three goals during a 2019–20 season which ended with defeat in the Bundesliga promotion play-off. Following a mid-table 2020–21 season in which he made 19 appearances and scored one goal, a torn muscle fibre interrupted the early months of Kerschbaumer's 2021–22 season. After his return, he made just five appearances and late in the season, it was announced that Kerschbaumer would be released when his contract expired in June 2022. Kerschbaumer ended his three-season spell at the Voith-Arena with 50 appearances and four goals.

Wolfsberger AC 
On 23 May 2022, Kerschbaumer signed a three-year contract with Austrian Bundesliga club Wolfsberger AC on a free transfer, effective 1 July 2022.

International career 

Kerschbaumer won 20 caps and scored two goals for Austria from U16 to U19 level between 2007 and 2010. He was a part of the U17 team which won the 2008 U17 Toto Cup.

Style of play 
Kerschbaumer was described by Marinus Dijkhuizen as a "box to box" midfielder. In June 2017, Brentford goalkeeper Daniel Bentley stated that Kerschbaumer was the best finisher at the club.

Personal life 
Kerschbaumer's father Toni is a youth coach at FC Tulln.

Career statistics

Honours 
Austria U17
 U17 Toto Cup: 2008

References

External links
 
 
 
 Konstantin Kerschbaumer at firstviennafc.at
 Konstantin Kerschbaumer at 2liga.at

1992 births
Living people
People from Tulln an der Donau
Austrian footballers
SK Rapid Wien players
First Vienna FC players
SKN St. Pölten players
FC Admira Wacker Mödling players
Austrian Football Bundesliga players
Brentford F.C. players
Austrian expatriate footballers
Austrian expatriate sportspeople in England
Expatriate footballers in England
Association football midfielders
Austria youth international footballers
English Football League players
Arminia Bielefeld players
1. FC Heidenheim players
2. Bundesliga players
Austrian expatriate sportspeople in Germany
FC Ingolstadt 04 players
Wolfsberger AC players